António Luís dos Santos Serrado aka Lunguinha, is an Angolan footballer who plays as a defender for Kabuscorp.

External links 
 

1986 births
Living people
Association football defenders
Angolan footballers
Angola international footballers
2013 Africa Cup of Nations players
Académica Petróleos do Lobito players
Atlético Petróleos de Luanda players
Atlético Petróleos do Huambo players
Atlético Petróleos do Namibe players
Estrela Clube Primeiro de Maio players
Kabuscorp S.C.P. players
Progresso Associação do Sambizanga players
S.H. Benfica (Huambo) players
Girabola players
People from Huambo